Buckminster Fuller: Thinking Out Loud is a 1996 PBS American Masters documentary drama film on the inventor, visionary, and thinker R. Buckminster Fuller produced and directed by Academy Award nominees Karen Goodman and Kirk Simon. Cinematography by Buddy Squires, edited by Sara Fishko, and a production of Simon & Goodman Picture Company.

Fuller, who died in 1983, is considered by some to be one of the 20th century's most noteworthy, controversial, and creative thinkers. The film looks at his unconventional life, his innovations, and his radical view of the contemporary world.  Best known as the inventor of the Geodesic Dome, Fuller had many other inventions, such as an air-streamed three-wheeled car and many other ideas of how to "benefit mankind."

The film includes interviews with Philip Johnson, Merce Cunningham, John Cage and Arthur Penn. It is narrated by Morley Safer, with Spalding Gray as the voice of Buckminster Fuller. The filmmakers were the first journalists to have open access to the vast collections of Fuller's personal papers. As Fuller was widely documented, the film includes extensive archival footage of Fuller from many sources. The film premiered in competition at the Sundance Film Festival in 1996 and was nominated for an Emmy for Best Cultural/Historical Documentary the same year.

References

External links
Buckminster Fuller: Thinking Out Loud, About R. Buckminster Fuller, American Masters, PBS, December 12, 2001

Biographical documentary films
Thinking Out Loud
American Masters films
1990s American films